Tina Wells is an American entrepreneur and writer. She is the CEO and founder of Buzz Marketing Group.

Career 
Tina Wells sits on the board for NPH USA, an international non-profit corporation. In addition to serving on the Young Entrepreneur Council, the United Nations Foundation's Global Entrepreneurs Council, and the board of directors for both the Philadelphia Orchestra Association and The Franklin Institute, she is also the current Academic Director of Wharton's Leadership in the Business World program.

In March 2018, Wells was appointed to Thinx board of directors.

Works
Wells, Tina (2011). Chasing youth culture and getting it right : how your business can profit by tapping into today's most powerful trendsetters and tastemakers. Hoboken, N.J.: John Wiley & Sons. .

Mackenzie Blue series 
Books illustrated by Michael Segawa.
 Mackenzie Blue. New York: Harper. .
 The Secret Crush. New York: Harper. ISBN 9780061583117
 Friends Forever? New York: Harper, 2010. ISBN 9780061583148
 Mixed Messages. New York: Harper, 2010. ISBN 9780061583179
 Double Trouble. New York: Harper, 2014 ISBN 9780062244130

Zee Files series 

 The Zee Files. Berkeley, California: West Margin Press, 2020. ISBN 9781513266268
 All that Glitters. Berkeley, California: West Margin Press, 2021. ISBN 9781513277349

Honest June series 
Books written with Stephanie Smith; illustrated by Brittney Bond.
 Honest June. New York: Random House, 2021. ISBN 978-0-593-37829-8
 The Show Must Go on. New York: Random House, publication expected 2022. ISBN 9780593378922

References

Year of birth missing (living people)
Living people
American women writers
American businesspeople
Hood College alumni
Henry Crown Fellows
21st-century American women